Dorjpalamyn Narmandakh (born December 18, 1975) is a Mongolian judoka. At the 1996 Summer Olympics, he won the bronze medal in the men's extra lightweight (< 60 kg) category, together with Richard Trautmann.

External links
 
profile

1975 births
Living people
People from Darkhan-Uul Province
Mongolian male judoka
Judoka at the 1996 Summer Olympics
Judoka at the 2000 Summer Olympics
Olympic judoka of Mongolia
Olympic bronze medalists for Mongolia
Olympic medalists in judo
Medalists at the 1996 Summer Olympics
Judoka at the 1998 Asian Games
Asian Games competitors for Mongolia
20th-century Mongolian people
21st-century Mongolian people